Smith D. Woods (December 2, 1830 – December 28, 1888) was a Democratic  Mayor of  Kansas City, serving a one-year term from 1874 to 1875.

Biography
He was born in Indiana. After moving to Kansas City, he operated a furniture store and then concentrated on real estate. He was elected as mayor in 1874.

References

1830 births
1888 deaths
Mayors of Kansas City, Missouri
19th-century American politicians
People from Indiana